George Holmes Marples (30 May 1883 — 30 December 1947) was an English cricketer who played first-class cricket for Derbyshire in 1905.

Marples was born in Attercliffe, Sheffield. He made two first-class appearances for Derbyshire in the 1905 season, his debut against the touring Australians when he took a wicket. In his second match, a week later against Marylebone Cricket Club, MCC won by an innings and 252 runs. Marples was a left-arm medium-fast bowler who took  one wicket in his career at an average of 116.00 and a tailend batsman who scored 11 runs in 4 innings in 2 first-class matches.

Marples died in Chesterfield at the age of 64.

References
George Marples at Cricket Archive 

1883 births
1947 deaths
English cricketers
Derbyshire cricketers
Cricketers from Sheffield
English cricketers of 1890 to 1918
People from Darnall